The Tylenol Par-3 Shootout was a skins game golf event that was played annually from 1999 to 2006. It was played on the par-3 Threetops course at the Treetops Resort in Gaylord, Michigan, USA.

In 2001 Lee Trevino earned a bonus of $1,000,000 by making a hole-in-one at the seventh hole on the first day.

Winners

Note: All players listed were Americans.

References

Golf in Michigan
Recurring sporting events established in 1999
Recurring sporting events disestablished in 2006
1999 establishments in Michigan
2006 disestablishments in Michigan